Harold Everett Greer (June 26, 1936 – April 14, 2018) was an American professional basketball player. He played for the Syracuse Nationals / Philadelphia 76ers of the National Basketball Association (NBA) from 1958 through 1973. A guard, Greer was a 10-time NBA All-Star and was named to the All-NBA Second Team seven times. He was named to the 50 Greatest Players in NBA History, the NBA 75th Anniversary Team, and his uniform number was among Philadelphia 76ers retired numbers. Greer is a member of the Basketball Hall of Fame.

High school and college
Born in Huntington, West Virginia, Greer attended Douglass Junior and Senior High School in Huntington. Douglass was an all-black school. He played as a guard for Douglass' men's basketball team. He enrolled at Marshall University and played college basketball for the Marshall Thundering Herd's basketball team, becoming the first African American to play for a public college in West Virginia.

With the Thundering Herd, Greer scored 1,377 points with a .545 field goal percentage, setting a Marshall record. In 1956, Marshall won the Mid-American Conference championship, and made their first NCAA men's basketball tournament appearance. Greer was named All-Mid-American Conference in 1957 and 1958. He was named an All-American in 1958 as well. Greer finished his Marshall career averaging 19.4 points per game and 10.8 rebounds per game. In 1958, his senior year, Greer averaged 23.6 points per game. Greer also played for the school's baseball team in his sophomore year as a first baseman.

NBA career
The Syracuse Nationals selected Greer with the 13th selection in the 1958 NBA draft. Greer played for Syracuse for five seasons, raising his scoring average to 22.8 points a game in 1961. He was selected for the NBA All-Star team that year.

In 1963, the Syracuse Nationals moved to Philadelphia to become the Philadelphia 76ers. There, Greer teamed with Wilt Chamberlain on the 1966–67 team that won the NBA championship. In the 76ers' 15 playoff games that season, Greer averaged a team-best 27.7 points. Greer had an unusual but highly effective free throw technique, shooting a jump shot from the charity stripe. He is usually considered the third-best guard of the 1960s, behind Oscar Robertson and fellow West Virginia native Jerry West.

Greer played in 10 NBA All-Star Games and was the MVP of the 1968 game when he went 8-for-8 from the field and scored 21 points, a record-breaking 19 in one quarter. He also was chosen to the All-NBA Second Team seven times, and scored 21,586 points during his NBA career. When he retired after the 1972–73 season, he ranked as the all-time leader in games played and was in the top ten in both points scored and field goals made. As of his death, Greer is the franchise record holder for points scored, field goals, field goal attempts, games played, and minutes played.

Post-playing career
In 1980, Greer coached the Philadelphia Kings of the Continental Basketball League. He also coached the basketball team for Germantown Academy in Fort Washington, Pennsylvania.

Legacy

Greer's hometown has honored his success by holding "Hal Greer Day" in 1966, and by renaming 16th Street, which carries West Virginia Route 10 as the main artery between the campus/downtown area and Interstate 64, as "Hal Greer Boulevard" in 1978. The 76ers retired Greer's uniform number, No. 15, in 1976; he was the first player the 76ers honored in this way. Marshall's men's basketball team retired Greer's No. 16. Marshall University inducted Greer into its Athletics Hall of Fame for his career in basketball and baseball in 1985.

In 1982, Greer was inducted into the Naismith Memorial Basketball Hall of Fame along with Slater Martin, Frank Ramsey, Willis Reed, coach Clarence Gaines, and contributor Alva Duer. Greer is recognized as one of the first African-American athletes enshrined in a major sports hall of fame from West Virginia. He was named one of the 50 Greatest Players in NBA History in 1996. The 76ers installed a statue of Greer at their training complex in 2017.

In 2021, Greer was honored at Marshall University with the dedication of a bronze statue created in his likeness and an unveiling ceremony with many of his family members in attendance. The statue is located adjacent to the Cam Henderson Center, the home of Marshall basketball, and was placed on a marble base surrounded by four benches and newly planted trees. Two weeks later, he was announced as part of the NBA 75th Anniversary Team. To commemorate the NBA's 75th Anniversary The Athletic ranked their top 75 players of all time, and named Greer as the 70th greatest player in NBA history.

Accolades

Averaged 22 ppg to lead 76ers to NBA Championship (1967)
Played in 10 consecutive NBA All-Star Games (1961–70)
NBA All-Star Game MVP (1968)
Set record for most points scored in a quarter (19) during an All-Star Game (1968)
Seven-time All-NBA Second Team (1963–69)
Scored 21,586 career points (40th all-time), including 50 in one game vs. Boston Celtics
Scored 1,876 points in 92 playoff games and 120 points in 10 All-Star Games
His jerseys were retired by Marshall University (#16) and the Philadelphia 76ers (#15)

Personal life
Greer and his wife, Mayme, had a son and two daughters. Greer died on April 14, 2018, following a brief illness. The 76ers announced his death on April 16. They honored Greer prior to Game 2 of the 2018 NBA Playoffs vs the Miami Heat. For the remainder of the playoffs, the Sixers wore a black armband on the sleeve of their jersey with a small patch with the number 15.

NBA career statistics

Regular season

Playoffs

See also

List of National Basketball Association career scoring leaders
List of National Basketball Association franchise career scoring leaders
List of National Basketball Association career minutes played leaders
List of NBA players who have spent their entire career with one franchise

References

External links

Basketball Hall of Fame profile

1936 births
2018 deaths
African-American basketball players
American men's basketball players
Basketball coaches from West Virginia
Basketball players from West Virginia
Continental Basketball Association coaches
Marshall Thundering Herd baseball players
Marshall Thundering Herd men's basketball players
Naismith Memorial Basketball Hall of Fame inductees
National Basketball Association All-Stars
National Basketball Association players with retired numbers
National Collegiate Basketball Hall of Fame inductees
Philadelphia 76ers players
Shooting guards
Small forwards
Sportspeople from Huntington, West Virginia
Syracuse Nationals draft picks
Syracuse Nationals players
20th-century African-American sportspeople
21st-century African-American people